Zofingen railway station is a railway station in the municipality of Zofingen, in the Swiss canton of Aargau. It is located at the junction of the standard gauge Olten–Lucerne and Zofingen–Wettingen lines of Swiss Federal Railways.

Services
The following services stop at Zofingen:

 InterRegio:
 Aargau S-Bahn:

References

External links 
 
 

Railway stations in the canton of Aargau
Swiss Federal Railways stations